The 1938 Lower Hutt mayoral election was part of the New Zealand local elections held that same year. The elections were held for the role of Mayor of Lower Hutt plus other local government positions including the nine borough councillors, also elected triennially. The polling was conducted using the standard first-past-the-post electoral method.

Background
The incumbent Mayor, Jack Andrews, sought re-election for a third term. Andrews was opposed by Labour Party candidate Percy Dowse who had been a councillor since 1935. The election marked the first where electoral terms for local government were extended from two years to three.

Mayoral results

Councillor results

Notes

References

Mayoral elections in Lower Hutt
1938 elections in New Zealand
Politics of the Wellington Region